While the Big Band Era suggests that big bands flourished for a short period, they have been a part of jazz music since their emergence in the 1920s when white concert bands adopted the rhythms and musical forms of small African-American jazz combos. While their place in popular culture dimmed greatly since their heyday in WWII, modern big band has made a resurgence, with the Roy Hargrove Big Band nominated for a Grammy and the Christian McBride Big Band winning a Grammy in 2012.

A
 Ray Anthony & His Orchestra
 Toshiko Akiyoshi – Lew Tabackin Big Band
 Antibalas Afrobeat Orchestra - afrobeat
 Darcy James Argue's Secret Society - jazz, steampunk
 Ariya Astrobeat Arkestra - afrobeat
 Louis Armstrong and His Orchestra

B
 BBC Big Band - jazz
 BBC Northern Dance Orchestra - swing music
 Charlie Barnet Big Band - jazz, swing
 Count Basie Orchestra - jazz, swing
 Beantown Swing Orchestra - swing
 Louie Bellson
 Tex Beneke Orchestra
 Berlin Jazz Orchestra
 Berlin Contemporary Jazz Orchestra – free jazz
 Bill Berry
 Big Band Jazz de México
 The Birdland Big Band - jazz
 Carla Bley Big Band and The Very Big Carla Bley Band – jazz, post bop
 Bohuslän Big Band - jazz
 Rob McConnell's Boss Brass - jazz
 Anthony Braxton's Creative Music Orchestra
 Les Brown and His Band of Renown - swing
 Ray Brown's Great Big Band - jazz
 Brussels Jazz Orchestra - jazz

C
 The Cab Calloway Orchestra
 The Capp-Pierce Juggernaut
 Ralph Carmichael Big Band
 Benny Carter
 Casa Loma Orchestra
 Cherry Poppin' Daddies (revival)
 Chopteeth - afrobeat
 Crescent Super Band - Jazz, Jump Swing, Modern Big Band, Swing Revival, Great American Songbook
Columbus Jazz Orchestra
 Kenny Clarke/Francy Boland Big Band
 Clayton-Hamilton Jazz Orchestra
Ray Conniff
 Spade Cooley - jazz, swing
 Coon-Sanders Original Nighthawk Orchestra
 Del Courtney
 Bob Crosby
Buddy Morrow

D
 Dallas Jazz Orchestra 
 John Dankworth Big Band - jazz, film music
 Sam Donahue and his orchestra
 Pierre Dørge's New Jungle Orchestra
 The Dorsey Brothers - jazz
 Jimmy Dorsey and His Orchestra
 Tommy Dorsey and His Orchestra
 DR Big Band - jazz
 Eddy Duchin and His Orchestra

E
 Billy Eckstine Orchestra - jazz, swing, bebop
 Ray Eberle and His Orchestra
 Either/Orchestra
 Duke Ellington and His Orchestra - jazz, orchestral jazz, swing
 Les Elgart
 Larry Elgart
 The Don Ellis Orchestra
 Ziggy Elman and His Orchestra
 Gil Evans & His Monday Night Orchestra a.o. – jazz, third stream, fusion jazz

F
 Maynard Ferguson
 Shep Fields and His Rippling Rhythm
 Ralph Flanagan Big Band - jazz
 Bob Florence's Limited Edition
 The Flying Horse Big Band (formerly the UCF Jazz Ensemble I) - jazz, swing, Afro-Cuban jazz, Latin jazz

G
 Michael Gibbs Orchestra
 Jean Goldkette
 Dizzy Gillespie and His Orchestra - jazz, bebop, Afro-Cuban jazz
 Globe Unity Orchestra – free jazz
 Benny Goodman and His Orchestra - jazz, swing
 Gordon Goodwin's Big Phat Band - jazz, swing music rhythm and blues
 George Gruntz Concert Jazz Band
 GRP All-Star Big Band

H
 Lionel Hampton and His Orchestra
 Hard Rubber Orchestra - modern jazz, new compositions, multimedia performances
 Erskine Hawkins
 Ted Heath and his Music - jazz
 Fletcher Henderson and His Orchestra - swing music, jazz
 Matthew Herbert Big Band
 Woody Herman
 Art Hickman
 Mark Hilburn and His Orchestra
  Tiny Hill and the Hilltoppers
 Earl Hines Orchestra - jazz, swing music, dixieland
 Bill Holman
 Claude Hopkins and His Orchestra - jazz
 Pee Wee Hunt

I
 ICP Orchestra – free jazz, avant-garde jazz
 International Sweethearts of Rhythm - jazz
 Irakere

J
 Illinois Jacquet
 Harry James Big Band - jazz
 Jazz Composer's Orchestra (founded by Carla Bley & Michael Mantler) - avant-garde jazz
 Jazz Orchestra of the Delta
 Gordon Jenkins
 The Thad Jones/Mel Lewis Orchestra
 Buddy Johnson

K
 Hal Kemp Big Band
 Stan Kenton and His Orchestra
 Andy Kirk and His Twelve Clouds of Joy
 Gene Krupa

L
 James Last Orchestra
 Syd Lawrence Orchestra
 Charlie Haden's Liberation Music Orchestra - avant-garde jazz, post-bop
 London Jazz Composers' Orchestra
 Loose Tubes – jazz, post-bop
 Joe Loss and His Orchestra
 Jimmie Lunceford and His Orchestra
 Humphrey Lyttelton Band

M
 Machito
 Magic City Jazz Orchestra
 Henry Mancini Orchestra
 Wingy Manone and His Orchestra
 Matteson-Phillips Tubajazz Consort
 McKinney's Cotton Pickers
 Jay McShann
 Glenn Miller Orchestra
 Mills Blue Rhythm Band
 Mingus Big Band
 Bob Mintzer
Monk'estra — John Beasley
 Buddy Morrow and his Orchestra
 Gerry Mulligan Concert Jazz Band
 David Murray Big Band
 Vaughn Monroe Big Band

N
 Nighthawks Orchestra

O
 King Oliver
 Will Osborne (singer)
 Oxford University Jazz Orchestra

P
 Pacific Mambo Orchestra
 Ed Palermo Big Band
 Gloria Parker
 Duke Pearson Big Band - hard bop, soul jazz, smooth jazz, post-bop
Art Pepper + 11
 Ben Pollack
 Lee Presson and the Nails - jazz, swing music (revival), jump blues, cabaret
 Tito Puente Orchestra

R
 Boyd Raeburn
 The Ramblers
 Don Redman and His Orchestra - jazz
 Alvino Rey Orchestra - swing, jazz, exotica
 Buddy Rich Big Band - jazz
 Edmundo Ros and His Orchestra
 RTV Slovenia Big Band
 Tito Rodriguez Orchestra
 Luis Russell and His Orchestra

S
 Bobby Sanabria Multiverse Big Band
 Sammy Kaye Orchestra
 Sauter-Finegan Orchestra - swing jazz
 Maria Schneider Orchestra
 The Brian Setzer Orchestra - swing music (revival), jump blues
 Artie Shaw and His Orchestra - swing music
 Charlie Spivak
 The Squadronaires
 Sun Ra Arkestra – jazz, avant-garde jazz, free jazz
Sweet Georgia Sound - Swing, Jazz, Big Band

T
 Jack Teagarden and His Orchestra
 Dan Terry Big Big Band - jazz
 Claude Thornhill
 Doc Severinsen and the Tonight Show Band
 The Top Hatters
 Orrin Tucker and His Orchestra
 Tommy Tucker and His Orchestra
 Taipei Jazz Orchestra

U
 Unifour
 University of North Texas One O'Clock Lab Band

V
 The Vanguard Jazz Orchestra
 Charlie Ventura Band - jazz, bebop
 Billy Vaughn Orchestra
 Vienna Art Orchestra - jazz, third stream, folk music
 Tommy Vig Orchestra

W
 Chris Walden Big Band
 Chick Webb and His Orchestra - jazz, swing
Lawrence Welk
 Dick Willebrandts and His Dance Orchestra - jazz, swing
 Gerald Wilson Big Band - jazz
 Paul Whiteman
 Widespread Depression Orchestra
 Jaco Pastorius's Word of Mouth Orchestra

See also
 Big band remote
 List of American big band bandleaders
 List of British big band leaders
 List of experimental big bands
 Territory Bands

References